Obaku Dokuryu (1596–1672) was a Japanese calligrapher, scholar, monk and artist.

Dokuryu was born in China, but fled to Japan during the Manchu conquest resulting from the Seven Grievances. After settling at an Ōbaku Zen Temple and becoming a monk, he produced numerous works of calligraphy. He died in 1672. Some of his works can be seen at the Indianapolis Museum of Art.

References

17th-century Japanese calligraphers
1596 births
1672 deaths
Japanese painters
Japanese medical writers
17th-century Chinese calligraphers
Edo period Buddhist clergy
Zenga
Buddhist artists